Abou Elela Mady (born 3 April 1958) is an Egyptian engineer and politician. He is the chairman of the Wasat Party and a former member of the Muslim Brotherhood. He was released from detention on 13 August 2015, 2 years after being arrested.

Education and career
Mady was born on 3 April 1958. He graduated from Minya University’s School of Engineering with honors in 1984, and also received a Bachelor of Laws from Cairo University.

Politics
Mady was the president of the students' union at Minya University in 1977, and then became the president of the students' union of all the Egyptian universities in 1978. Mady joined the Muslim Brotherhood in the 1980s, and then left the Muslim Brotherhood with the aim of founding a new political party with a new vision of moderate democratic Islamic reference in 1996.

References

1958 births
Living people
Egyptian engineers
Members of the Egyptian Constituent Assembly of 2012
Minya University alumni
Cairo University alumni